The WEW (World Entertainment Wrestling) World Tag Team Championship is a tag team professional wrestling championship formerly contested in the Japanese promotions Frontier Martial-Arts Wrestling, World Entertainment Wrestling and Apache Pro-Wrestling Army, and currently contested in A-Team. The title is sometimes called the FMW/WEW World Tag Team Championship.

Title history

See also
WEW Heavyweight Championship
FMW Brass Knuckles Tag Team Championship, predecessor.

References

Frontier Martial-Arts Wrestling championships
Tag team wrestling championships
1999 establishments in Japan